Akaza is a Japanese surname. Notable people with the surname include:

, Japanese urologist
, Japanese actress
, Japanese daimyō
, Japanese samurai

Fictional characters
, a character in the manga series YuruYuri
Akaza, from Demon Slayer: Kimetsu no Yaiba

Japanese-language surnames